Eleonora De Paolis (born 27 July 1986) is an Italian paracanoeist who won medals at senior level between World Championships and European Championships.

She acquired her disability in a car accident in 2011, she has been practicing the Paralympic sport since 16 October 2016.

Career
She competed at the 2020 Summer Paralympics.

References

External links
 
 Eleonora De Paolis at the Italian Paralympic Committee

1986 births
Living people
Paracanoeists of Italy
Paralympic rowers of Italy